Shubhmangal Online is an Indian Marathi television serial which is aired on Colors Marathi. It is produced by Manjiri Bhave under the banner of Kanha's Magic.

Plot 
A marriage fixed during lockdown, where Sharvari and Shantanu have never meet personally, a few video calls is the reason of their life bond. Shantanu is shy guy  who says that their parents have forced him for marriage whereas Sharvari seems like confident and fun loving girl.

Reception

Airing history

Cast 
 Sayali Sanjeev as Sharvari Gawaskar
 Suyash Tilak as Shantanu Sadavarte
 Sukanya Kulkarni as Anupama Sadavarte
 Samidha Guru as Aishwarya Randive
 Archana Nipankar as Rucha Gawaskar
 Rushikesh Wamburkar as Chinmay Kamat
 Guru Divekar as Harshad Gawaskar
 Ankita Panvelkar as Madhuri Gawaskar
 Shraddha Pokhrankar as Minakshi Palekar
 Asmita Khatkhate as Ratna
 Yogesh Kelkar as Jagdish Gawaskar
 Amita Khopkar as Padma Aatya
 Anand Ingale as Harinivas Guruji
 Milind Phatak as Shrikant Sadavarte
 Sachin Deshpande as Advocate Kirti Kumar Agnihotri

Awards

References

External links 
 Shubhmangal Online at Voot
 

Marathi-language television shows
2020 Indian television series debuts
Colors Marathi original programming
2021 Indian television series endings